The New York Velodrome  was a state-of-the-art bicycle track at 225th Street, between Exterior Street and Broadway within the Kingsbridge and Kingsbridge Heights neighborhoods of the Bronx.  It bordered the Marble Hill neighborhood.  After the surrounding of Marble Hill was filled in and merged to the Bronx or the mainland, the space filled in became part of Kingsbridge.  The velodrome was built on top of the new land that was available.  The New York and Putnam Railroad stopped in front of it at the Kingsbridge Station (a building that still stands today).  The Velodrome was one of the largest velodromes in the world.  It became a popular destination for professional cyclist. The velodrome was destroyed in a fire on August 4, 1930.

Years later, different businesses were built on top of the site.  Today, the parking garage and Target store section of the River Plaza (Shopping Mall) is present.

See also 
 Coney Island Velodrome
 Newark Velodrome

References

External links 
 MyInwood.net - New York Velodrome

Velodromes in New York City
Defunct sports venues in Manhattan
1930 disestablishments in New York (state)
Sports venues demolished in 1930
Sports venues in the Bronx
Kingsbridge, Bronx